The 1796 United States House of Representatives election in Delaware was held October 4, 1796. James A. Bayard Sr. won the election.

Results

References

Delaware
1796
1796 Delaware elections